Maryhill Central was a railway station to the north west of Glasgow.

Location 
To the west of the station was a triangular set of junctions. Immediately to the west was Maryhill Central junction where the line to Kirklee diverged to the south and the Lanarkshire and Dunbartonshire Railway headed east to Bellshaugh Junction where the western side of the triangle (from Kirklee Junction at the southern point of the junctions) and the Lanarkshire and Dunbartonshire Railway met before the line to Dawsholm diverged to the north.
There was another Maryhill station to the north.

Closure 
It was closed to passengers on 2 November 1959 on the Glasgow Central Railway route and on 5 October 1964 on the Lanarkshire and Dunbartonshire Railway between Possil and Partick, with the lines in the area being closed on 5 October 1964.

Current site usage 
The site of the station is now occupied by Maryhill Shopping Centre which was built in the early 1980s this was rebuilt in around 2010 to consist of a Large supermarket with 4 retail units and car parking below.
However, a space was left in the basement of the shopping centre to allow the line to be re-opened in future; this was still considered an option in the mid-1990s with the building of a large bingo hall on the cutting east of site left a channel for the original line to be re-opened below ground.

In 1999, however, this prospect was put to rest with the sale of land for housing along many parts of the track in the Kirklee and Cleveden sections of the track along with the demolition of many of the bridges around the same area for safety reasons. Maryhill Shopping Centre was demolished in early 2010 and replaced by a new Tesco supermarket. The void beneath the supermarket for the railway station has again been retained to allow the future possibility of reopening the railway line.

Railway routes

1900s map of Maryhill

References

Notes

Sources 
 
 
 

Disused railway stations in Glasgow
Railway stations in Great Britain opened in 1894
Railway stations in Great Britain closed in 1964
Beeching closures in Scotland
Former Caledonian Railway stations
Maryhill